The Maverik Center, originally known as the E Center, is a 12,000-seat multi-purpose arena located in West Valley City, Utah, United States. Construction on the arena started in 1996 and was completed in time to hold its first event on September 22, 1997. The arena is owned by West Valley City, and managed by Centennial Management Group, Inc.

During the 2002 Winter Olympics it served as the main venue for the ice hockey events, and as the venue for ice sledge hockey during the 2002 Winter Paralympics. Today the arena is home to the Utah Grizzlies along with the Salt Lake City Stars, and it is also a major venue in the area for numerous concerts and live touring productions.

History
In July 1995, only a month after winning the 2002 Winter Olympic bid, the Salt Lake Organizing Committee (SLOC) accepted a proposal from West Valley City to build a new ice hockey facility in their city. SLOC loaned $7 million to the city for construction costs, and would rent the arena from the city during the Olympic Games. The arena would be funded through a variety of ways, but would be owned by the municipality of West Valley City, and used for various events before and after the games. Ground was broken for the arena on March 22, 1996, and construction was completed in September 1997; the E Center was officially dedicated in a ceremony on September 19, 1997. The first event held in the new venue was WCW's Monday Nitro Live on September 22, 1997, notable for being the in-ring debut of Bill Goldberg.

Naming rights
In 2010, Centennial Management Group and West Valley City, announced that a new partnership (which included naming rights) had been reached with Maverik, Inc., owners of convenience stores throughout the Intermountain West. The sponsorship deal is a multi-year agreement, which included exclusive sponsorship and advertising rights, prominent signage on the exterior and interior of the building, along with a name change to the Maverik Center. Additionally, the venue now features Maverik's proprietary "adventure theme", a Maverik concession outlet, and exclusively sells a number of Maverik proprietary products.

In 2021, the arena's parking was used as a drive thru vaccination clinic during the COVID-19 pandemic.

Tenants

Present

The venue's primary tenant is the ECHL's Utah Grizzlies. The Grizzlies have played at the arena since replacing the AHL's former team of the same name in 2005.

On October 10, 2022, it was announced that the Utah Jazz's NBA G-League team, the Salt Lake City Stars will be moving into the Maverik Center as their home arena beginning with the 2022-2023 season.

Past
The arena used to be home to the Utah Freezz of the World Indoor Soccer League from 1999 to 2001.

The PBR hosted a Built Ford Tough Series event at the E Center in 2007; it was the PBR's first stop in the Salt Lake City area since 2000, when they visited the Delta Center.

In indoor football, the arena previously hosted the Utah Warriors of the National Indoor Football League from 2003 to 2004. In the 2010 season, the E Center became the home for the re-launched Arena Football League's version of the Utah Blaze (formerly the Utah Valley Thunder) that ceased operations when the AFL declared bankruptcy and suspended operations in 2009. However, the Blaze returned to their old home at the EnergySolutions Arena for the 2011 season. In 2017, the arena was used for the home games of the Salt Lake Screaming Eagles, a team in the Indoor Football League that used fan interaction to help run the team.

2002 Winter Olympics and Paralympics
The arena served as one of the venues for ice hockey during the 2002 games, with events spread out during six days in 31 sessions. The indoor facility was capable of holding 8,400 spectators, plus press members, during the competitions. 96.7% of available tickets were sold, for a total of 230,657 spectators witnessing events in the arena. During the 2002 Winter Paralympics the arena hosted the ice sledge hockey events.

Concerts
As part of their performance at the arena on November 2, 1998, Phish performed Pink Floyd's Dark Side of the Moon album in its entirety. Depeche Mode performed at the arena three times: the first one was on July 23, 2001 during their Exciter Tour. The second one was on November 12, 2005 during their Touring the Angel. The third one was on August 25, 2009 during their Tour of the Universe, in front of a crowd of 6,601 people. The 2009 show was recorded for the group's live albums project Recording the Universe. One Direction and Sam Smith performed in the arena in 2013 and 2015 respectively.

References

External links

Maverik Center Official Website

1997 establishments in Utah
Basketball venues in Utah
Buildings and structures in West Valley City, Utah
Gymnastics venues in the United States
Indoor arenas in Utah
Indoor ice hockey venues in the United States
Indoor soccer venues in the United States
Music venues completed in 1997
NBA G League venues
Olympic ice hockey venues
Salt Lake City Stars
Sports venues completed in 1997
Sports venues in Salt Lake County, Utah
Sports venues in Utah
Utah Grizzlies (1995–2005)
Venues of the 2002 Winter Olympics